Meet the Richardsons is a British comedy television series that premiered 27 February 2020, on Dave. It stars husband and wife comedians Jon Richardson and Lucy Beaumont as fictionalised versions of themselves discussing their lives in a mockumentary format. Various comedians and celebrities make appearances, ostensibly also as fictionalised versions of themselves.

In August 2020, it was announced an 8-episode second series would screen in 2021, with two Christmas specials broadcast in December 2020.  A third series began broadcasting in March 2022.

Cast and characters

Main characters
 Jon Richardson as Jon
 Lucy Beaumont as Lucy
 Elsie Richardson as Elsie, Jon & Lucy's daughter
 Michele Austin as Dani Julian, Jon's agent
 Damion Priestley as Damion, Jon and Lucy's neighbour
 Emma Priestley as Emma, Jon and Lucy's neighbour
 Thomas Priestley as Thomas, Damion and Emma's son

Recurring & guest characters

Episodes

Series 1 (2020)

2020 Christmas Specials

Series 2 (2021)

Series 3 (2022)

References
General
 https://www.chortle.co.uk/news/2020/08/17/46717/well_meet_the_richardsons_again
 https://www.comedy.co.uk/tv/news/5895/meet-the-richardsons-series-2/
 https://theversion.co/the-version-2/2020/8/17/meet-the-richardsons-lands-second-season-and-two-christmas-specials-on-
 https://www.beyondthejoke.co.uk/content/9239/lucy-beaumont-christmas

Specific

External links
 
 

Episode list using the default LineColor
2020 British television series debuts
2020s British comedy television series
English-language television shows
Dave (TV channel) original programming
Television shows set in England
Mockumentary television series